Neophyl chloride, C6H5C(CH3)2CH2Cl, is a halogenated organic compound with unusual nucleophilic substitution properties. Neophyl chloride is used to form a versatile organolithium reagent, neophyl lithium, by reaction with lithium.

Preparation 
Neophyl chloride was first synthesized by Haller and Ramart from neophyl alcohol by a nucleophilic substitution reaction, using thionyl chloride as the chlorinating agent:

C6H5C(CH3)2CH2OH + SOCl2 → C6H5C(CH3)2CH2Cl + HCl + SO2

H2C=C(CH3)CH2Cl + C6H6 → C6H5C(CH3)2CH2Cl

It can also be prepared by halogenation  of tert-butylbenzene, using sulfuryl chloride.

Reactions and applications 
Neophyl chloride can be used to form an organolithium reagent, neophyl lithium, by reaction with lithium. Organolithium reagents are useful due to their nucleophilic properties and their ability to form carbon-to-carbon bonds, like in reactions with carbonyls.

C6H5C(CH3)2CH2Cl + 2Li → C6H5C(CH3)2CH2Li + LiCl

Neophyl chloride is of interest to organic chemists due to its substitution properties. Neophyl chloride is a neopentyl halide which means it is subject to the neopentyl effect. This effect makes SN2 nucleophilic substitution highly unlikely because of steric interactions due to the branching of the β-carbon. No rotamer of the molecule would allow a backside attack of the α carbon.

β-Hydride elimination also does not occur with neophyl derivatives as this group lacks hydrogens at the β positions. These factors make neophyl chloride a precursor to intermediates that resist common substitution and elimination reactions.

References 

Organochlorides
Phenyl compounds